The Anglican Diocese of Ekiti Oke is one of twelve within the Anglican Province of Ondo, itself one of 14 provinces within the Church of Nigeria: the current bishop is the Rt Rev. Isaac Olatunde Olubowale.

Notes

Church of Nigeria dioceses
Dioceses of the Province of Ondo